Sune Almkvist (4 February 1886 – 8 August 1975) was a Swedish  bandy player, hockey player and footballer. He was inducted with the number 1 in the Swedish Bandy Hall of Fame in 2011.

Almkvist was the first major Swedish hockey player and the first who received the award Big Guy, He played for IFK Uppsala, a club which dominated bandy in Sweden from the first Swedish championship in 1907 until 1920.

Almkvist started his long hockey career at Upsala Gymnastics Sisters hockey club at the age of 15 in 1901. The club won the 1902 Nordic Games trophy by defeating Stockholm Hockey Club 2–0. That year Sune Almkvist set a very high team goal record by making 19 goals in one match against the Force Academy (Karlberg) in the Nordic Festival hockey tournament. The match ended 27–1.

He was also the first president of the Swedish Bandy Association from its founding in 1925 until 1950.

Almkvist also played four matches for the Sweden national football team at the 1908 Summer Olympics.

References

External links

1886 births
1975 deaths
Swedish bandy players
Swedish footballers
IFK Uppsala Bandy players
IFK Uppsala Fotboll players
Olympic footballers of Sweden
Footballers at the 1908 Summer Olympics
Association football forwards
Sweden international footballers